Pablo Made "Valera" Martinez (born June 29, 1969 in Sabana Grande de Boyá, Monte Plata, Dominican Republic) is a former Major League Baseball shortstop. He played one season with the Atlanta Braves in 1996 between July 20 and August 4.

References

External links
 

1969 births
Allentown Ambassadors players
Arizona League Padres players
Atlanta Braves players
Binghamton Mets players
Charleston Rainbows players
Dominican Republic expatriate baseball players in the United States
Greenville Braves players
High Desert Mavericks players

Living people
Louisville Redbirds players
Major League Baseball players from the Dominican Republic
Major League Baseball shortstops
Memphis Redbirds players
Norfolk Tides players
Richmond Braves players
Somerset Patriots players
Spokane Indians players
St. Lucie Mets players
Wichita Wranglers players